Gene Williams (né Eugene Williams; born October 14, 1968) is a former NFL guard who played nine seasons in the NFL from 1991 to 1999. He started in Super Bowl XXXIII for the Atlanta Falcons. He played his high school football at Creighton Preparatory School in Omaha, Nebraska. His team went undefeated and won the Class A state title his senior year.

1968 births
Living people
American football offensive linemen
Iowa State Cyclones football players
Miami Dolphins players
Cleveland Browns players
Atlanta Falcons players
People from Blair, Nebraska